The 2009/10 FIS Nordic Combined World Cup was the 27th world cup season, a combination of ski jumping and cross-country skiing organized by FIS. It started in Kuusamo, Finland on 28 November 2009 and ended on 14 March 2010 in Oslo, Norway.

Schedule changes
 On 27 November 2009, it was announced by the FIS that the 5–6 December 2009 events was moved from Trondheim to Lillehammer because of warm weather and lack of snow in Trondheim.
 On 4 December 2009, it was announced by FIS that the 12–13 December 2009 events in Harrachov were cancelled to warm weather and lack of snow. By 6 December 2009, a possibility that one ski jumping and one Nordic combined World Cup event could take place in Harrachov on 15–16 December 2009. A decision will be made on 9 December 2009 at 1200 CET. By 8 December 2009, it was decided to cancel Harrachov though a third competition may be added to 18 December in Ramsau. Rescheduling in Ramsau for 18 December 2009 was confirmed on 8 December 2009.

Calendar

Men

Team

Standings

Overall 

Standings after 19 events.

Nations Cup 

Standings after 21 events.

References

2009-10 Nordic combined schedule. - accessed 8 November 2009.

External links
FIS-Ski Home Nordic Combined - Official Web Site

FIS Nordic Combined World Cup
Fis Nordic Combined World Cup, 2009-10
Fis Nordic Combined World Cup, 2009-10